Joe Devine Airway Park was a minor league baseball stadium in the western United States, located in Boise, Idaho. Opened  in 1939, the ballpark was the home of Boise's teams (Pilots, Yankees, Braves) in the Class C Pioneer League, which briefly moved to Class A in 1963, the final year of the Braves and the ballpark.

Originally "Airway Park," it was the home of the Pilots and was a few blocks east of the Boise Airport, then located at the present-day campus of Boise State University. The city donated  of the western portion of Municipal Park (now Kristin Armstrong Municipal Park) in 1939 for the ballpark.

Opened with a seating capacity of 3,000, it was increased to 5,000 after World War II.

Yankees
When the New York Yankees moved their Pioneer League affiliate from Twin Falls to Boise after the 1951 season, the ballpark was renamed in March to honor Joe Devine (1892–1951), a talented Yankees scout in the West who had played for the Boise Irrigators of the Union Association. The park was officially dedicated to Devine on Thursday,

Braves
The Milwaukee Braves became the parent club in 1955 and it was renamed "Braves Field."

After demolition

The minor leagues briefly returned to Boise in 1975 and 1976 with the Boise A's of the short season Northwest League at Borah Field (today's Bill Wigle Field). The independent Buckskins existed for one unsuccessful season in 1978, and the Hawks arrived after the 1986 season from the Tri-Cities in south central Washington. After two years at Wigle Field, the Hawks moved to the new Memorial Stadium in northwest Boise , at the start of the 1989 season.

See also
Boise Braves players (1955–1963)
Boise Pilots players (1939–1942, 1946–1951, 1954)
Boise Yankees players (1952–1953)

References

External links
New York Times – obituary for Joe Devine 
Boise State University Library – 1950s photo of Bronco Stadium and Braves Field
Baseball Reference – teams history, Boise, Idaho

Defunct baseball venues in the United States
Defunct sports venues in Idaho
Buildings and structures in Boise, Idaho